Clarisonic, or Pacific Bioscience Laboratories, Inc., was a company based in Redmond, Washington that produced the Clarisonic line of skin care devices. The company was sold to L'Oreal in 2011. In 2018, Clarisonic devices made up 14% of the skin care device market. In July 2020, L'Oréal announced it would discontinue the Clarisonic brand and products, choosing instead to focus on other core business offerings. It is speculated that the actual cause was increasing competition from cheaper alternatives as the skin care device market grew. As of September 30, 2020, the business and brand were discontinued.

Availability

During its peak days, Clarisonic products were available to spa owners, physicians and consumers, and the brand was available in over 50 countries.

Co-Founders

Clarisonic was founded by David Giuliani, Robb Akridge, Steve Meginniss, Ward Harris, and Ken Pilcher in 2000. Giuliani, Clarisonic's CEO, is the former co-founder and CEO of Optiva, which developed the Sonicare line of toothbrushes. Giuliani sold Optiva to Philips Oral Healthcare in 2000.

Akridge was a scientist at Optiva Corporation before co-founding Clarisonic. He holds a bachelor's degree from University of Texas, a Master of Science degree in biology from Texas State University–San Marcos and a doctorate in microbiology from Texas A&M University.

Ken Pilcher is the lead inventor of Clarisonic's skin care systems. In the past, he has developed avionics for the NASA Space Shuttle, as well as medical electronics.

Clarisonic was backed by angel groups including Keiretsu Forum who provided the seed capital for the company

Awards and recognition

2012
 Glamour (magazine) Best Skin Device 
 Allure (magazine) Best of Beauty

References

Companies based in Redmond, Washington
Cosmetics companies of the United States
Skin care
L'Oréal brands
2011 mergers and acquisitions